Šurianky is a village and municipality in the Nitra District in western central Slovakia, in the Nitra Region.

History
In historical records the village was first mentioned in 1270.

Geography
The village lies at an altitude of 160 metres and covers an area of 10.4 km2. It has a population of about 570 people.

Ethnicity
The population is about 98% Slovak.

References

External links
http://www.statistics.sk/mosmis/eng/run.html

Villages and municipalities in Nitra District